Son Ye-jin (born Son Eon-jin on January 11, 1982) is a South Korean actress. She rose to fame in 2003 for The Classic and Summer Scent, which were followed by the commercially successful A Moment to Remember (2004) and April Snow (2005). Her early roles in films garnered her the title "Nation's First Love" in Korea. She since has won various acting recognitions and acted in high-profile films including My Wife Got Married (2008), The Pirates (2014), the 2016 films The Truth Beneath and The Last Princess, and The Negotiation (2018). She has also acted in the successful television dramas Alone in Love (2006), Personal Taste (2010), Something in the Rain (2018), Crash Landing on You (2019–2020), and Thirty-Nine (2022).

She has been included in Forbes Korea Power Celebrity 40 for four consecutive years 2019–2022.

Career

2000–2005: Beginnings and East Asia stardom
Son Ye-jin was the voice of Jung Mi-jo in Park Ki-hyung's film Secret Tears in 2000, and then went on to take the leading role in television dramas such as Delicious Proposal, Sun-hee and Jin-hee,  and Great Ambition. Her first high-profile role in cinema was in Im Kwon-taek's Chi-hwa-seon, which screened at Cannes and took home a Best Director award in 2002.

The biggest success of her early career was in the subsequent films Lovers' Concerto and The Classic. Both were solid mid-level hits in Korea, and The Classic in particular — being a work of My Sassy Girl director Kwak Jae-yong — received wide exposure in regions such as Hong Kong and mainland China, and launched Son into East Asia stardom. Son further solidified her status as a Hallyu (Korean Wave) star in 2003 by taking the lead in TV drama Summer Scent, the third installment of season-themed tetralogy Endless Love drama series directed by Yoon Seok-ho.

Her next films also gained massive popularity in East Asia particularly in Japan: A Moment to Remember, based on a famous Japanese series, set box office records in Japan and sold over two million tickets in Korea, and April Snow in which she co-starred with superstar Bae Yong-joon was also a hit in Japan and China. Son, who adorned a pure and innocent image in her films The Classic and A Moment to Remember, was given the title of the "Nation's First Love" in Korea.

In 2006, she became the highest-paid Korean actress in Korean television series when she was guaranteed a talent fee of KRW 50 million (plus incentive) per episode for her lead role in SBS drama Alone in Love.

2006–2015: Film roles in diverse genres
Son then cast off her nice girl image in her next projects. She took on the roles of a con artist in The Art of Seduction, an ambitious reporter in Spotlight, a femme fatale in Open City, and a divorcée in the critically acclaimed series Alone in Love. In 2008, her portrayal of a polyandrous woman in My Wife Got Married bagged her Best Actress honors from the prestigious Blue Dragon Film Awards and other local award-giving bodies.

After filming the dark mystery White Night, Son wanted to do a more fun project, so she chose the romantic comedy series Personal Taste,
followed by the horror-romantic comedy film Spellbound which became one of the top-grossing films in 2011 and by far the most successful Korean romantic comedy movie in recent years.

In 2012, Son starred in her first blockbuster The Tower, a remake of the 1974 Hollywood disaster film The Towering Inferno. She returned to television in 2013 in the revenge drama Shark (also known as Don't Look Back: The Legend of Orpheus), then headlined Blood and Ties, a thriller about a daughter who suspects that her father was involved in a kidnap-murder case.

Son reunited with Shark costar Kim Nam-gil in the 2014 period adventure film The Pirates, which received mixed reviews but was a commercial hit with more than 8.6 million admissions at the end of its theatre run and won Son the Best Actress award at the Grand Bell Awards. The Pirates is one of the highest-grossing Korean films of all time, along with other Son Ye Jin's movies, The Tower and The Last Princess. Son next starred in the black comedy Bad Guys Always Die opposite Taiwanese actor Chen Bolin, a Chinese-Korean co-production that was filmed on Jeju Island.

2016–present: Critical acclaim and global recognition
In 2016, Son reunited with My Wife Got Married co-star Kim Joo-hyuk in The Truth Beneath, a political thriller; where she received acclaim for her performance. She won Best Actress at the 25th Buil Film Awards and 17th Busan Film Critics Awards for her performance. She then played Princess Deokhye in the biopic The Last Princess, helmed by April Snow director Hur Jin-ho. The film drew positive reviews by critics and went on to become a box office hit, grossing US$40.35 million worldwide. Sung So-young of the Korea JoongAng Daily praised the film for being "interesting enough to hold the audience's interest from beginning to end", even though she felt the screenwriter's (Hur) imagination went too far in several scenes. She said major events from Princess Deokhye's life were portrayed well, and the film's biggest virtue was how it made audiences want to know more about her. Rumy Doo of The Korea Herald said  Son Ye-jin proved herself a "sensitive and technically refined performer." Son was praised by critics for her "outstanding" performance in her portrayal of "the unfathomable depths on the emotional ups and downs of Deokhye"; winning multiple accolades for her performance.

In 2018, Son starred alongside So Ji-sub in the romance film Be with You, based on the Japanese novel of the same name. The same year, Son returned to the small screen after five years with JTBC's romance drama Something in the Rain. The series achieved commercial popularity, and Son received rave reviews for her performance. Son also starred in crime thriller The Negotiation, alongside Hyun Bin, playing a professional negotiator working to save hostages.

In 2019, Son reunited with Hyun Bin in the global hit romance drama Crash Landing on You as a rich heiress who falls in love with a North Korean commission officer. The drama was a huge success and is the third-highest-rated Korean drama in cable television history.

Son was scheduled to have her Hollywood debut in 2022, starring opposite Sam Worthington in filmmaker Andrew Niccol's work The Cross. However, because of the Covid 19 pandemic her agency requested a delay in filming.

Personal life

Relationship and marriage
On January 1, 2021, it was confirmed that Son had been in a relationship with actor Hyun Bin, her co-star in The Negotiation (2018) and Crash Landing on You (2019–2020), since the year prior, after Crash Landing on You concluded. On February 10, 2022, Son and Hyun Bin announced their engagement in letters posted on their social media accounts. They married in a private ceremony on March 31, attended by their parents and friends of both families. On June 27, Son announced that she was pregnant with the couple's first child, and she gave birth to a son on November 27.

Philanthropy
On February 27, 2020, Son donated  million to Community Chest of Korea in Daegu to help fight the spread of COVID-19. Daegu is Son's hometown.

On March 8, 2022, Son and Hyun Bin donated  million to the Hope Bridge Disaster Relief Association to help those affected by the massive wildfire that began in Uljin, Gyeongbuk and spread to Samcheok, Gangwon.

Filmography

Film

Television series

Awards and nominations

Son has been the recipient of many awards throughout her career. She currently has won a total of 51 awards out of 72 nominations.

References

External links

 
  
 

1982 births
Living people
21st-century South Korean actresses
Best Actress Paeksang Arts Award (film) winners
Best Actress Paeksang Arts Award (television) winners
People from Daegu
Seoul Institute of the Arts alumni
South Korean film actresses
South Korean television actresses
Best New Actress Paeksang Arts Award (film) winners